Moumouni Siuley (born 1964) is a Nigerien boxer. He competed in the men's bantamweight event at the 1988 Summer Olympics.

References

1964 births
Living people
Nigerien male boxers
Olympic boxers of Niger
Boxers at the 1988 Summer Olympics
Place of birth missing (living people)
Bantamweight boxers